Susan Maureen Fleetwood (21 September 1944 – 29 September 1995) was a British stage, film, and television actress, who specialized in classical theatre. She received popular attention in the television series Chandler & Co and The Buddha of Suburbia.

Early life 
Fleetwood was born in St Andrews, Fife, Scotland, the daughter of Bridget Maureen (née Brereton) and John Joseph Kells Fleetwood, an RAF officer. She was the elder sister of musician and actor Mick Fleetwood, drummer of rock band Fleetwood Mac. The service family was stationed in Egypt in the years before the Suez crisis and, afterwards, in Norway where John Fleetwood received a NATO appointment and where Susan received her first role as the Old Testament Joseph in a school play. On her return to the UK, she was encouraged to take up drama by a nun at a convent school, winning a scholarship to the Royal Academy of Dramatic Art at the age of sixteen.

Stage
After training with RADA, where a student production won Fleetwood the Bancroft gold medal, in 1964 she joined the company of the Liverpool Everyman theatre, where her fellow student Terry Hands had been appointed director. When Hands moved to the RSC in 1967, she followed. In 1968 at Stratford she gave two commanding performances: in the relatively unpromising part of Cassandra in Troilus and Cressida and as Regan in Lear. In 1969, under the direction of Hands, she movingly doubled the parts Thaisa and Marina in Pericles.

In 1974, she played Imogen in John Barton's production of Cymbeline. Many principal roles followed, until in 1977 the former RSC director Peter Hall persuaded her to join him in the National Theatre company where, in addition to playing Ophelia to Albert Finney's Hamlet, she was offered parts from a wider repertory of plays. In the early 1980s she appeared in seasons with both companies, including a memorable Rosalind in As You Like It. Her last season with the RSC was 1990–91.

Personal life
Fleetwood's partner at the time of her death was theatre director Sebastian Graham Jones.

Death
After suffering from ovarian cancer for a decade, Fleetwood died in Salisbury, Wiltshire, England on 29 September 1995, aged 51,

Select TV and filmography
Hamlet (BBC television recording of a Prospect Theatre Company stage performance, 1972), Ophelia, opposite Ian McKellen
The Watercress Girl (Granada's Country Matters series, 1972) title role
Don't Be Silly (BBC Television Play for Today, 1979) as Pamela RedmanThe Good Soldier (Granada Television, 1981) as LeonoraClash of the Titans (1981) as AthenaHeat and Dust (1983) as Mrs. Crawford, the Burra Memsahib (The Nineteen Twenties in the Civil Lines at Satipur)Minder (1983) Series 4 Episode 2 "Senior Citizen Caine" as Sonia Caine
 Strangers and Brothers (1984) as Lady Caroline Quaife (2 episodes)Young Sherlock Holmes (1985) as Mrs. DribbThe Sacrifice (1986) as AdelaideWhite Mischief (1987) as Gwladys, Lady DelamereDream Demon (1988) as DeborahSummer's Lease (1989) as Molly PargeterThe Krays (1990) as RoseSix Characters in Search of an Author (TV drama, 1992) as The MotherShakespeare: The Animated Tales: Hamlet (series, 1992) as Queen Gertrude (voice)The Buddha of Suburbia (TV drama 1993) as Eva KayLovejoy (TV drama, Series 5, Episode 8, 1993) as Mary Gladden
 Under the Hammer (TV, 1994) as  Calpurnia Beacon
 Wycliffe (TV, 1994) as Lady Cynthia BottrellChandler & Co (BBC Television, 1995) as Kate PhillipsPersuasion'' (1995) as Lady Russell

References

External links
RSC performance database

1944 births
1995 deaths
Deaths from ovarian cancer
People from St Andrews
Royal Shakespeare Company members
British film actresses
British stage actresses
British television actresses
British voice actresses
Deaths from cancer in England
20th-century British actresses
Alumni of RADA